Hanpu, later Wanyan Hanpu, was a leader of the Jurchen Wanyan clan in the early tenth century. According to the ancestral story of the Wanyan clan, Hanpu came from Goryeo when he was sixty years old, reformed Jurchen customary law, and then married a sixty-year-old local woman who bore him three children. His descendants eventually united Jurchen tribes into a federation and established the Jin dynasty in 1115. Hanpu was retrospectively given the temple name Shizu and the posthumous name Emperor Yixian Jingyuan by the Jin dynasty.

Chinese historians have long debated whether Hanpu was of Silla, Goryeo, or Jurchen ethnicity. Since the 1980s, they have chiefly argued that he was a Jurchen who had lived in Silla, the state that had dominated the Korean peninsula until it was destroyed by Goryeo in 935. Western scholars usually treat Hanpu's story as a legend, but agree that it hints to contacts between some Jurchen clans and the states of Goryeo and Balhae (a state located between Jurchen lands and Silla until it was destroyed in 926) in the early tenth century. In Korea, a recent KBS history special treated Hanpu as a native Silla man who moved north and settled in Jurchen lands during the demise of Silla.

Name
Hanpu is known under different transliterations in Chinese sources. He is called Kanfu in the Songmo Jiwen (after 1155), the memoirs of a Song Chinese ambassador who was forced to stay in Jin territory for more than 10 years starting in 1131. The Shenlu Ji , a lost book cited in the Collected Documents on the Treaties with the North during Three Reigns (1196), refers to him as Kenpu, whereas Research on the Origin of the Manchus (1777) calls him Hafu.

Ancestor of the Wanyan clan
Because the early Jurchens had no written records, the story of Hanpu was first transmitted orally. According to the History of Jin (compiled in the 1340s), Hanpu was originally from Balhae. He arrived from Goryeo at the age of sixty and settled among the Jurchen Wanyan clan. Other sources claim that Hanpu was from Silla, the state that had ruled the Korean peninsula but was annexed by the kingdom of Goryeo in 935. The same story recounts that when Hanpu left Goryeo, his two brothers remained behind, one in Goryeo and one in the Balhae area. Because the Jurchens considered Hanpu to be the sixth-generation ancestor of Wanyan Wugunai (1021–1074), historians postulate that Hanpu lived in the early tenth century, when the Jurchens still consisted of independent tribes, or sometime between the founding of Goryeo in 918 and its destruction of Silla in 935.

The Wanyan clan then belonged to a group of Jurchen tribes that Chinese and Khitan documents called "wild", "raw", or "uncivilized" (shēng ). These "wild Jurchens" lived between the Changbai Mountains in the south (now at the border between North Korea and Northeast China) and the Sungari River in the north, outside the territory of the rising Liao dynasty (907–1125) and little influenced by Chinese culture.

To resolve an endless cycle of vendettas between two clans, Hanpu managed to make both parties accept a new rule: from then on, the family of a killer would compensate the victim's relatives with a gift of horses, cattle, and money. Historian Herbert Franke has compared this aspect of Jurchen customary law to the old Germanic practice of Wergeld. As a reward for putting an end to the feuds, Hanpu was married to a sixty-year-old woman who then bore him one daughter and two sons. A lost book called the Shenlu Ji states that Hanpu's wife was 40 years old. Hanpu and his descendants were then formally received into the Wanyan clan.

Hanpu's ethnicity
Chinese scholars have debated the ethnicity of Hanpu. They usually agree that Hanpu's "coming from Goryeo" does not mean he was of Goryeo ethnicity, since Goryeo territory was populated by several ethnic groups back then. The people of the time did not always distinguish between state and ethnic group, so that in modern terms Hanpu may have been a Jurchen from the state of Silla, a man of Goryeo, or a Silla man. According to Songmo Jiwen, Hanpu's surname was already Wanyan before he moved from Goryeo. Historian Sun Jinji has therefore argued that Hanpu was a Jurchen whose family had lived in Silla and then Goryeo before moving back to Jurchen land. Chinese historians Menggutuoli and Zhao Yongchun both argue that Hanpu's ancestors were Jurchens who had lived in Silla and had been absorbed into Goryeo after the latter defeated Silla. Furthermore, Zhao theorizes that Wanyan Yingge calling Goryeo his "parent country" may have been part of the Jurchens' diplomatic efforts to obtain Goryeo's help in fighting the Liao dynasty. 

Meanwhile, some Korean scholars support the idea that Hanpu was likely an ethnic Sillan from Goryeo that fled north towards Jurchen territories during the Later Three Kingdoms. Overall, it is believed that his ethnicity is unclear. Korean historians such as Kang Jun-young and Kim Wi-hyeon, as well as Chinese historians such as Jin Yufu also weigh on the hypothesis that Hanpu was likely "a man of Silla" that lived in the Goryeo dynasty following Silla's downfall. According to official Qing dynasty sources, the founder of Jin was from either Silla or Goryeo but came from the Tungusic Sushen tribes.

The annals of King Yejong (r. 1105–1122) in the History of Goryeo report that Wanyan Wugunai's son Yingge (盈歌; 1053–1103) considered Goryeo as his "parent country" because his clan's ancestor Hanpu had come from Goryeo. However Wanyan Yingge initiated an invasion of the Korean peninsula and Yingge's paternal nephew Wanyan Wuyashu fought against the Koreans, forcing them to submit and recognize Jurchens as overlords after "pacifying" the border between the Koreans and Jurchens. Yingge died during the conquest of Helandian (曷懶甸; present-day Hamgyong Province, North Korea) after pacifying the Tumen River basin. Wuyashu resumed the project in the next year. Under his order, Shishihuan (石適歡) led a Wanyan army from the Tumen River basin to subdue rival Jurchen tribes in Helandian and advance southward to chase about 1,800 remnants who defected to the Korean kingdom Goryeo. Goryeo did not hand them over but sent Im Gan (林幹) to intercept the Wanyan army. However, Shishihuan defeated Im Gan north of the Chŏngp'ŏyng wall and invaded northeastern frontier of Goryeo. Goryeo dispatched Yun Gwan to resist the Jurchens but lost in battle again. As a result, Wuyashu subjugated the Jurchens in Helandian.

In 1107, Goryeo sent a delegate, Heihuanfangshi (黑歡方石), to celebrate Wuyashu's accession to the chieftainship of the Wanyan tribe, and promised to return those Helandian Jurchens who escaped to Goryeo. However, when Wuyashu's delegates, Aguo (阿聒) and Wulinda Shengkun (烏林答勝昆), arrived in Goryeo, the Koreans killed them and dispatched five large armies led by Yun Gwan to attack Helandian. The Goryeo army destroyed a hundred Jurchen villages and built nine fortresses there. Wuyashu thought about giving up Helandian, but his brother Aguda convinced him to dispatch Wosai (斡賽), another of their brothers, to fight Goryeo. Wosai also built nine fortresses facing Goryeo's nine fortresses. After a one-year battle, the Wanyan army won two fortresses but they suffered heavy losses and seven other fortresses were still held by the Goryeo forces. Jurchens offered a truce to Goryeo and Goryeo and the Jurchens achieved a settlement. As a result, Jurchens swore not to invade Goryeo and Goryeo withdrew from the nine fortresses.

Wuyashu also pacified the Suifen River basin. 

Western scholars usually consider Hanpu's story legendary. Herbert Franke explains that this Jurchen "ancestral legend" probably indicates that the Wanyan clan absorbed immigrants from Goryeo and Balhae sometime in the tenth century. Frederick W. Mote, who calls this account of the founding of the Wanyan clan a "tribal legend", claims that Hanpu's two brothers (one who stayed in Goryeo and one in Balhae) might have represented "the tribe's memory of their ancestral links to these two peoples." One Western historian of Jurchens has even proposed that Hanpu was not even from the Korean peninsula, instead what really happened was that a power on the peninsula ruled the Jurchen tribe he came from, or that he was from the Eastern Jurchens (Changbai Mountain Jurchens) who did not live in the Korean peninsula.

Legacy

The Wanyan clan rose to prominence among the Jurchens after 1000 CE. Hanpu's sixth-generation descendant Wanyan Wugunai (1021–1074) started to consolidate the dispersed Jurchen tribes into a federation. Wugunai's grandson Aguda (1068–1123) defeated the Jurchens' Khitan overlords of the Liao dynasty and founded the Jin dynasty in 1115. By 1127, the Jin had conquered all of north China from the Song dynasty.

In 1136 or 1137, soon after Emperor Xizong of Jin (r. 1135–1150) had been crowned, Hanpu was given the posthumous name "Emperor Jingyuan" and the temple name "Shizu", meaning "first ancestor." In 1144 or 1145, Hanpu's burial site was named "Guangling". In December 1145 or January 1146, his posthumous title was augmented to that of "Emperor Yixian Jingyuan".

Family members
Hanpu's wife posthumously received the title of Empress Mingyi  in 1136. The History of Jin, an official history that was compiled by Mongol scholar Toqto'a in the 1340s, lists Hanpu's family members as follows:

Children:
Wulu  (eldest son and successor)
Wolu  (second son)
Zhusiban  (daughter)

Siblings:
Agunai  (elder brother, who is said to have liked Buddhism and to have stayed in Goryeo when Hanpu left)
Baohuoli  (younger brother)

References

Notes

Works cited

. 
. 
.
.
.
. 
. 
 
. 
.
. 
 (hardback).  (paperback).

.

Further reading

Jurchen rulers
Year of birth unknown
Year of death unknown